This is an alphabetical list of the fungal taxa as recorded from South Africa. Currently accepted names have been appended.

Sa
Genus: Saccharomyces
Saccharomyces acidi-lactici Grotenf.
Saccharomyces cerevisiae Hansen.
Saccharomyces fragilis Jorg.
Saccharomyces sp.

Family: Saccharomycetaceae

Saccharomycetaceae Imperfectae

Genus: Saccobolus
Saccobolus depauperatus Phill.

Genus: Sacidium
Sacidium gomphocarpi Kalchbr. & Cooke

Genus: Sagedia
Sagedia albo-atra Müll.Arg.

Genus: Sarcographa (Lichens)
Sarcographa disjectans Zahlbr.

Genus: Sarcogyne (Lichen)
Sarcogyne austro-africana H.Magn. 
Sarcogyne davulus H.Magn.
Sarcogyne lugens H.Magnus. 
Sarcogyne robiginans H.Magn.

Genus: Sarcoscypha
Sarcoscypha coccinea Jacq.

Sc
Genus: Schiffnerula
Schiffnerula cissi Hansf.
Schiffnerula compositanium Petrak.
Schiffnerula doidgeae Hansf. 
Schiffnerula gymnosporiae Hansf. 
Schiffnerula nuxiae Hansf. 
Schiffnerula radians Hansf.
Schiffnerula whitfieldiae Hansf.
Schiffnerula sp.

Genus: Schinzinia
Schinzinia pustulosa Fayod (1889),

Genus: Schismatomma (Lichens)
Schismatomma paradoxum Zahlbr.
Schismatomma septenarium Zahlbr.

Genus: Schislodes
Schislodes erysiphina Theiss.

Genus: Schizophyllum
Schizophyllum alneum  J.Schröt. (1889), accepted as Schizophyllum commune Fr. (1815)
Schizophyllum commune Fr.
Schizophyllum flabellare Fr.
 
Genus: Schizosaecharomyces
Schizosaecharomyces ovis Quin.

Genus: Schizothyriella
Schizothyriella eylesiana v.d.Byl.

Genus: Schneepia
Schneepia brachylaenae Rehm
Schneepia radiata Doidge

Genus: Schroeteriaster
Schroeteriaster doidgeae Syd.
Schroeteriaster stratosus Syd.

Genus: Schulzeria Bres. & Schulzer (1886), accepted as Leucoagaricus Locq. ex Singer (1948)
Schulzeria umkowaan Sacc.

Genus: Scleroderma
Scleroderma aurantium Pers. (sic), accepted as Scleroderma citrinum Pers.
Scleroderma bovista Fr.
Scleroderma capensis Lloyd
Scleroderma carcinomale Pers. 
Scleroderma cepa Pers.
Scleroderma flavidum Ell. & Everh.
Scleroderma geaster Fr.
Scleroderma laeve Lloyd
Scleroderma lejospermum de Toni
Scleroderma nitidum Berk.
Scleroderma pyramidatum Kalchbr.
Scleroderma rhodesica Verw.
Scleroderma stellenbossiensis Verw.
Scleroderma tenerum Berk. & Curt.
Scleroderma verrucosum Pers.
Scleroderma vulgare Homem. ex Fr.

Order: Sclerodermales

Family: Sclerodermataceae

Genus: Sclerogaster
Sclerogaster africanus Lloyd
Sclerogaster rhodesica Nel.
Sclerogaster salisburiensis Verwoerd

Genus: Sclerospora
Sclerospora butleri Weston.
Sclerospora graminicola Schroet.
Sclerospora indica Butler.
Sclerospora maydis Butler.
Sclerospora sorghi West. & Epp

Genus: Sclerotinia
Sclerotinia fructicola (G.Winter) Rehm (1906), accepted as Monilinia fructicola (G.Winter) Honey (1928)
Sclerotinia sclerotiorum de Bary

Genus: Sclerotium
Sclerotium cepivorum Berk. 1841, accepted as Stromatinia cepivora (Berk.) Whetzel [as 'cepivorum'], (1945)
Sclerotium delphinii Welch.
Sclerotium paspali P.Henn.
Sclerotium rolfsii Sacc. (1911), accepted as Athelia rolfsii (Curzi) C.C. Tu & Kimbr.
Sclerotium stipitatum Berk. & Curr.
Sclerotium sp.

Genus: Scolecodothis
Scolecodothis capensis Doidge

Genus: Scolecopeltis
Scolecopeltis cassipoureae Doidge
Scolecopeltis eugeniae Doidge
Scolecopeltis morganae Doidge
Scolecopeltis myrsinis Doidge
Scolecopeltis strauchii Doidge

Genus: Scolecosporium
Scolecosporium pedicellatum Dearn. & Overh.
 
Genus: Scoleiocarpus
Scoleiocarpus tener Berk.

Genus: Scopulariopsis
Scopulariopsis sphaerospora F.Zach.

Genus: Scorias
Scorias sp.

Genus: Scutellinia
Scutellinia capensis (Nel).
Scutellinia corpinaria (Nel).
Scutellinia hemispherica (Nel).

Genus: Scyphophorum
Scyphophorum monocarpum Ach.

Se
Genus: Sebacina
Sebacina africana Burt.

Family: Secotiaceae

Genus: Secotium
Secotium gueinzii Kunze.
Secotium obtusum Lloyd

Genus: Septobasidium
Septobasidium bagliettoanum Bres.
Septobasidium bogoriense Pat.
Septobasidium carestianum Bres. var. natalense Couch.
Septobasidium curtisii Boedijn & Steinm
Septobasidium grandispinosum Couch.
Septobasidium griseopurpureum Couch.
Septobasidium mompa Rac.
Septobasidium natalense Couch.
Septobasidium pedicellatum Pat.
Septobasidium philippense Couch.
Septobasidium protractum Syd.
Septobasidium pseudopedicellatum Burt.
Septobasidium sp.

Genus: Septogloeum
Septogloeum acaciae Verw. & du Pless.
Septogloeum arachidis Racib., (1898), accepted as Mycosphaerella berkeleyi W.A. Jenkins, (1938)
Septogloeum bullatum Syd.
Septogloeum concentricum Syd.
Septogloeum manihotis Zimm.
Septogloeum mori Bri. & Cav.
Septogloeum punetatum Wakef.

Genus: Septoria
Septoria antirrhini Desm.
Septoria apii Chester.
Septoria apii-graveolentis Dorogin.
Septoria aracearum Sacc.
Septoria ari
Septoria atriplicis Fuck.
Septoria avenae A.B. Frank, (1895), accepted as Phaeosphaeria avenaria f.sp. avenaria O.E. Erikss., (1967)
Septoria asaleae Vogl.
Septoria bambusae Verw. & du Pless.
Septoria buddleiae Kalchbr. & Cooke
Septoria byliana Syd.
Septoria capensis Eint.
Septoria caryophylli Scalia.
Septoria cephalariae Kalchbr.
Septoria cercosporioides Trail.
Septoria chenopodii West.
Septoria chrysanthemella Sacc.
Septoria chrysanthemi Allesch.
Septoria citri Pass.
Septoria citrulli Ell. & Everh.
Septoria commelynes Kalchbr. & Cooke.
Septoria cotyledonis Wakef.
Septoria cucurbitacearum Sacc.
Septoria dianthi Desm.
Septoria doehlii Syd.
Septoria drummondii Ell. & Everh.
Septoria eucleae Kalchbr.
Septoria evansii Syd.
Septoria fructigena Berk. & Curt.
Septoria gerberae Syd.
Septoria gladioli Pass.
Septoria gomphocarpi P.Henn.
Septoria graminum Desm., (1843) accepted as Zymoseptoria tritici (Roberge ex Desm.) Quaedvl. & Crous, (2011)
Septoria gymnosporiae Syd.
Septoria helianthi Ell. & Kellerm.
Septoria helichrysi Syd.
Septoria knowltoniae Verw. & Dipp.
Septoria lactucae Pass.
Septoria lolii Sacc.
Septoria longispora Miyake.
Septoria lycopersici Speg.
Septoria meliae Syd.
Septoria nesodes Kalchbr.
Septoria nodorum (Berk.) Berk., (1845), accepted as Phaeosphaeria nodorum (E. Müll.) Hedjar., (1969)
Septoria oenotherae West.
Septoria oleae Dur. & Mont.
Septoria ornithogali Pass.
Septoria osteospermi Dipp.
Septoria passerini Sacc.
Septoria passiflorae Louw.
Septoria pelargonii Syd.
Septoria perforans McAlp.
Septoria petroselini Desm.
Septoria petroselini var. apii Bri. & Cav.
Septoria pisi West.
Septoria podocarpi Thuem.
Septoria polygoni-lapathifolii v.d.Byl.
Septoria pyricola Desm. accepted as Mycosphaerella pyri (Auersw.) Boerema, (1970)
Septoria ribis Desm.
Septoria richardiae
Septoria rubi Westend.,(1854), accepted as Coryneopsis rubi (Westend.) Grove, (1937)
Septoria scabiosicola Desm.
Septoria schlechteriana P.Henn.
Septoria sparmanniae Verw. & du Pless.
Septoria thuemenii Sacc.
Septoria tritici Desm. (1842), accepted as Zymoseptoria tritici (Roberge ex Desm.) Quaedvl. & Crous, (2011)
Septoria umbelliferarum Kalchbr.
Septoria vignae P.Henn.
Septoria zeina Stout.
Septoria sp.

Genus: Septoriella
Septoriella striiformis Sacc.

Genus: Septosporium
Septosporium heterosporum Ell. & Gal.

Genus: Seynesia
Seynesia balanme Speg. var. africana Sacc.
Seynesia orbiculata Syd.

Si
Genus: Siphula (Lichens)
Siphula ceratites Fr.
Siphula decumbens Kyi.
Siphula dregei
Siphula incrustans Vain.
Siphula minor Vain.
Siphula tabularis Nyl.
Siphula torulosa Nyl.
 
Genus: Sirothecium
Sirothecium citri Bitanc.

Sk
Genus: Skierka
Skierka robusta Doidge

So
Genus: Solenia
Solenia candida Pers.
Solenia minima Cooke & Phill.

Genus: Solenopezia
Solenopezia columbina Sacc.

Genus: Solorina (Lichens)
Solorina sorediifera Nyl.

Genus: Solorinina
Solorinina sorediifera Stizenb.

Genus: Sordaria
Sordaria anserina Wint.
Sordaria curvula de Bary.
Sordaria pleiospora Wint.
Sordaria setosa Wint.
Sordaria sp.
  
Family:Sordariaceae

Genus: Sorodiscus
Sorodiscus radicicolus Ivimey Cook

Genus: Sorosporella
Sorosporella uvella Giard.
Sorosporella sp.
  
Genus: Sorosporium
Sorosporium africanum Syd.
Sorosporium afrum Syd.
Sorosporium austroafricanum Zundel.
Sorosporium brachiariae Hopkins.
Sorosporium cenchri Zundel.
Sorosporium clintonii Zundel.
Sorosporium consanguineum Ell. & Everh.
Sorosporium cryptum McAlp.
Sorosporium everhartii Ell. & Gall.
Sorosporium filiferum Zundel.
Sorosporium flanaganianum Zundel.
Sorosporium harrismithense Zundel.
Sorosporium healdii Zundel.
Sorosporium holstii P.Henn.
Sorosporium hotsonii Zundel.
Sorosporium inconspicuum Zundel.
Sorosporium panici McKinnon.
Sorosporium pretoriaense Zundel.
Sorosporium proliferatum Zundel.
Sorosporium pseudomaranguense Zundel.
Sorosporium reilianum (J.G. Kühn) McAlpine (1910), accepted as Sporisorium reilianum (J.G. Kühn) Langdon & Full.,(1978)
Sorosporium setariae McAlp.
Sorosporium simii Pole Evans.
Sorosporium tembuti P.Henn. & Pole Evans
Sorosporium tristachydis Syd.
Sorosporium verecundum Zundel.
Sorosporium versatilis Zundel.
Sorosporium wildemanianum P.Henn.
Sorosporium zundelianum Ciferri.
Sorosporium sp.

Sp
Genus: Spegazzinia
Spegazzinia meliolae Zimm.
 
Genus: Sphaceloma
Sphaceloma ampelinum de Bary. (1874), accepted as Elsinoë ampelina Shear (1929)
Sphaceloma fawcetti Jenkins.
Sphaceloma perseae Jenkins.
Sphaceloma poinsettiae Jenkins.
Sphaceloma rosarum (Pass.) Jenkins, (1932), avccepted as Elsinoë rosarum Jenkins & Bitanc., (1957)
Sphaceloma violae Jenkins.
Sphaceloma sp.
 
Genus: Sphacelotheca
Sphacelotheca amphilophis Syd.
Sphacelotheca andropogonis Bubak.
Sphacelotheca anthephorae Zundel.
Sphacelotheca concentrica Zundel.
Sphacelotheca cruenta (J.G. Kühn) Potter, (1912), accepted as Sporisorium cruentum (J.G. Kühn) Vánky, (1985)
Sphacelotheca densa Ciferri.
Sphacelotheca dinteri Zundel.
Sphacelotheca doidgeae Zundel.
Sphacelotheca evansii Zundel.
Sphacelotheca flagellata Zundel.
Sphacelotheca modesta Zundel.
Sphacelotheca moggii Zundel.
Sphacelotheca monilifera Clint.
Sphacelotheca natalensis Zundel.
Sphacelotheca panici-miliacei Bubak.
Sphacelotheca pappophori Zundel.
Sphacelotheca pretoriense Zundel.
Sphacelotheca reiliana Clint. accepted as Sporisorium reilianum (J.G. Kühn) Langdon & Full., (1978)
Sphacelotheca ruprechtii Syd.
Sphacelotheca sorghi (Ehrenb. ex Link) G.P.Clinton (1902)accepted as Sporisorium sorghi Ehrenb. ex Link (1825)
Sphacelotheca tenuis Zundel.
Sphacelotheca transvaalensis Zundel.
Sphacelotheca vryburgii Zundel.
Sphacelotheca zilligii Zundel.

Genus: Sphaerella
Sphaerella agapanthi Kalchbr. & Cooke
Sphaerella brassicicola de Bary.(sic) possibly (Duby) Ces. & De Not. (1863), accepted as Mycosphaerella brassicicola (Duby) Lindau (1897)
Sphaerella cassinopsidis Kalchbr. & Cooke
Sphaerella geicola Kalchbr. & Cooke
Sphaerella macowaniana Wint.
Sphaerella maculicola Wint.
Sphaerella myrsinis Kalchbr. & Cooke

Genus: Sphaeria
Sphaeria africana Kalchbr. & Cooke
Sphaeria brachiata Kalchbr. & Cooke
Sphaeria caffra Kalchbr. & Cooke
Sphaeria capensis Lev.
Sphaeria cervispora Kalchbr. & Cooke
Sphaeria cumana Sacc. & Speg.
Sphaeria graminis Pers. var. ehrhartae Berk.possibly accepted as Phyllachora graminis (Pers.) Fuckel, (1870)
Sphaeria hypoxylon Linn.
Sphaeria intercepta Kalchbr. & Cooke
Sphaeria lanceolata Kalchbr. & Cooke
Sphaeria lichenoides Berk.
Sphaeria metidoidea Kalchbr. & Cooke
Sphaeria nesodes Berk. & Br. f. hydrocotles asiatcae.
Sphaeria nigro-annulata Berk. & Curt.
Sphaeria owaniae Kalchbr. & Cooke
Sphaeria refracta Kalchbr. & Cooke
Sphaeria tremelloides Linn.
Sphaeria turbinaia Pers. 
Sphaeria urticae Rabenh.
 
Genus: Sphaericeps
Sphaericeps lignipes Welv. & Curr.

Family: Sphaeriaceae

Order: Sphaeriales

Family: Sphaerioidaceae

Family: Sphaerobolaceae

Genus: Sphaerobolus
Sphaerobolus stellatus Tode ex Pers.

Genus: Sphaerodothis
Sphaerodothis parinarii Nel.

Genus: Sphaeronema
Sphaeronema pistillare Wallr.

Family: Sphaerophcraceae

Genus: Sphaerophoron
Sphaerophoron compressum Ach.

Genus: Sphaerophorus
Sphaerophorus inelanocarpus DC.

Genus: Sphaerophragmium
Sphaerophragmium artabotrydis Doidge 
Sphaerophragmium dalbergiae Diet.

Order: Sphaeropsidales

Genus: Sphaeropsis
Sphaeropsis abnormis Berk. & Thuem.
Sphaeropsis cassinopsidis Pazschke.
Sphaeropsis congesta Lev.
Sphaeropsis enormis Sacc.
Sphaeropsis corticalis Sacc.
Sphaeropsis malorum Peck.(sic), possibly (Berk.) Berk. (1860), accepted as Botryosphaeria stevensii Shoemaker, (1964)
Sphaeropsis mappae Cooke
Sphaeropsis pinicola Speg.
Sphaeropsis rafniicola P.Henn.
Sphaeropsis sp.

Genus: Sphaerostilbe
Sphaerostilbe coccophila Tul.
Sphaerostilbe flammea Tul.
Sphaerostilbe hypocreoides Kalchbr. & Cooke
Sphaerostilbe incarnata Kalchbr.
Sphaerostilbe macowani Cooke
Sphaerostilbe nigrescens Kalchbr. & Cooke
Sphaerostilbe pseudotrichia (Schwein.) Berk. & Broome, (1873), accepted as Nectria pseudotrichia (Schwein.) Berk. & M.A. Curtis, (1853)
Sphaerostilbe rosea Kalchbr.

Genus: Sphaerotheca
Sphaerotheca fuliginea Salm. (sic) (Schltdl.) Pollacci, (1913), accepted as Podosphaera fuliginea (Schltdl.) U. Braun & S. Takam., (2000)
Sphaerotheca humuli Burr. accepted as Podosphaera macularis (Wallr.) U. Braun & S. Takam., (2000)
Sphaerotheca humuli var. fuliginea Salm. probably accepted asPodosphaera macularis (Wallr.) U. Braun & S. Takam., (2000)
Sphaerotheca macularis Jacz. (sic) probably accepted asPodosphaera macularis (Wallr.) U. Braun & S. Takam., (2000)
Sphaerotheca pannosa  (Wallr.) Lév. (1851), accepted as Podosphaera pannosa (Wallr.) de Bary, (1870)
Sphaerotheca pannosa var. persicae  Woron. (1914), accepted as Podosphaera pannosa (Wallr.) de Bary, (1870)

Genus: Sphaerulina
Sphaerulina eucalypti Verw. & du Pless.
Sphaerulina oleifolia v.d. Byl.
Sphaerulina worsdellii Mass.

Genus: Sphinctrina
Sphinctrina fuscescens Nyl.
Sphinctrina gelasinata Zahlbr.
Sphinctrina meridionalis Stizenb.
Sphinctrina microcephala Nyl.
Sphinctrina turbinaia deNot.

Genus: Spondylocladium
Spondylocladium atrivirens Harz.

Genus: Spongospora
Spongospora subterranea Lagerh.

Genus: Sporidesmium
Sporidesmium celastri Thuem.
Sporidesmium polymorphum Corda.

Genus: Sporopodium
Sporopodium leucoxanthemum Vain.

Genus: Sporormia
Sporormia ambigua Niessl.
Sporormia intermedia Auersw.
Sporormia minima Auersw.
Sporormia pascua Niessl.
Sporormia transvaalensis Doidge

Genus: Sporotrichum
Sporotrichum beurmanni Matruchot & Ramond. accepted as Sporothrix schenckii Hektoen & C.F.Perkins (1900)
Sporotrichum carougeaui Langeron.
Sporotrichum citri Butl.
Sporotrichum epiphyllum Link.
Sporotrichum globuliferum Speg.
Sporotrichum paranense Marchion.
Sporotrichum roseum Link.
Sporotrichum schencki Matruchot.
Sporotrichum schencki var. beurmanni Doidge
Sporotrichum sp.

Genus: Spumaria
Spumaria alba DC.

Sq
Genus: Squamaria
Squamaria speciosa Frege.

St
Genus: Stachybotrys
Stachybotrys atra Corda. accepted as Stachybotrys chartarum (Ehrenb.) S.Hughes
Stachybotrys subsimplex Cooke

Genus: Stachylidium
Stachylidium theobromae Turcz.

Genus: Staganospora
Staganospora atriplicis Lindau.
Staganospora cryptogea Syd.
Staganospora kentiae Maubl.
Staganospora nerinicola Dipp.

Genus: Staurothele
Staurothele clopima Th.Fr.
  
Genus: Stemphylium
Stemphylium eugeniae Verw, & du Pless
Stemphylium phyllogenum Sacc.
Stemphylium sp.

Genus: Stephanophoron
Stephanophoron phyllocarpum var. daedaleum Stizenb.

Genus: Stephanophorou
Stephanophorou phyllocarpum var. isidiosum Stizenb.

Genus: Stephanophorus
Stephanophorus kraussii Flotow.

Genus: Stereocaulon (Lichen)
Stereocaulon proximum Nyl.
Stereocaulon pulvinatum Ach.
Stereocaulon tabulare Ach.

Genus: Stereum
Stereum acerinum Pets, ex Fr.
Stereum adnatum Lloyd.
Stereum affine Lev.
Stereum albo-badium Fr.
Stereum amoenum Kalchbr. & MacOwan.
Stereum atrocinereum v.d. Byl.
Stereum australe Lloyd.
Stereum bellum Sacc.
Stereum bicolor (Pers.) Fr., (1838), accepted as Laxitextum bicolor (Pers.) Lentz, 1956
Stereum bresadoleanum Lloyd.
Stereum caperatum Lloyd.
Stereum cinerascens Mass.
Stereum cinereum Lev.
Stereum concolor Sacc.
Stereum cyphelloides Berk. & Curt.
Stereum diaphanum Cooke ex Saec.
Stereum durbanense v.d.Byl.
Stereum duriusculum Berk. & Br.
Stereum elegans Mey.
Stereum fasciatum Fr.
Stereum friesii Lev.
Stereum fulvum Sacc.
Stereum fuscum Quel. (sic), possibly (Schrad.) P.Karst., (1883) accepted as Laxitextum bicolor (Pers.) Lentz, 1956
Stereum glabrescens Berk.& Curt.
Stereum hirsutum Fr.
Stereum hirsutum f. kalchbrenneri
Stereum involutum Klotzsch ex Fr.
Stereum kalchbrenneri Sacc.
Stereum laxum Lloyd, (1915) accepted as Laxitextum bicolor (Pers.) Lentz, 1956
Stereum lobatum Fr.
Stereum lobatum var. cinereum Lloyd.
Stereum luteo-badium Fr.
Stereum membranaceum Fr.
Stereum murrayi Burt.
Stereum nitidulum Berk.
Stereum notatum Berk. & Br.
Stereum ochraeeo-flavum Peck.
Stereum ostrea Fr.
Stereum percome Berk. & Br.
Stereum perlatum Berk.
Stereum proximum Lloyd.
Stereum pulverulentum Lev.
Stereum purpureum Fr. (sic), possibly Pers. (1794), accepted as Chondrostereum purpureum (Pers.) Pouzar (1959)
Stereum pusillum Berk.
Stereum radicans Burt.
Stereum ravenelii Berk. & Curt.
Stereum retirugum Cooke
Stereum rimosum Berk.
Stereum rimosum var. africanum Talbot.
Stereum rubiginosum Fr.
Stereum rugosum Fr.
Stereum sanguinolentum Fr.
Stereum schomburgkii Berk.
Stereum spadiceum Fr.
Stereum subpileatum Berk.,
Stereum tabacinum Sow. ex Fr. var. australis Mont.
Stereum tenebrosum Lloyd.
Stereum thozetii Berk.
Stereum tomentosum v.d.Byl.
Stereum transvaalium v.d.Byl.
Stereum turgidum Lloyd.
Stereum umbrinum Berk. & M.A. Curtis, (1873), accepted as Lopharia crassa (Lév.) Boidin, (1959)
Stereum vellereum Berk.
Stereum versicolor Fr.
Stereum villosum Lev.
Stereum vitile Fr.
Stereum vorticosum Fr. accepted as Chondrostereum purpureum (Pers.) Pouzar (1959)
 
Genus: Sterrebeckia
Sterrebeckia geaster Fr.
Sterrebeckia lejosperma Fr.

Genus: Stichodothis
Stichodothis disciformis Petrak.

Genus: Stichomyces
Stichomyces capensis Thaxt.

Genus: Stichospora
Stichospora disciformis Petrsk.

Genus: Sticta (Lichens)
Sticta ambavillaria Ach.
Sticta argyracea Del.
Sticta argyracea f. rigidula Zahlbr.
Sticta argyracea var. aspera Krempelh. 
Sticta argyracea var. flavescens Zahlbr.
Sticta aspera Laur.
Sticta aurata Ach.
Sticta aurata var. pallens Nyl.
Sticta carpoloma Del. var. albocyphellata Nyl
Sticta clathrata deNot.
Sticta elathrata var. subhirsuta Vain.
Sticta crocata Ach.
Sticta crocata var. gilva Ach.
Sticta crocata var. isidialia Gyeln.
Sticta damaeeomis Ach.
Sticta ecklonii Spreng.
Sticta endochrysea Del.
Sticta erythroscypha Tayl.
Sticta fuliginosa Aeh.
Sticta gilva Ach.
Sticta gilva var. angustilobata Gyeln.
Sticta gilva var. lanata Gyeln.
Sticta gilva var. pseudogilva Gyeln.
Sticta homemanni Fr.
Sticta hottentotta Ach.
Sticta hottentotta var. umbilicata Del.
Sticta intricata Del.
Sticta intrieata var. hesseana Zahlbr.
Sticta limbata Aeh.
Sticta mougeotiana Del.
Sticta mougeotiana var. aurigera Nyl.
Sticta pulmonacea Ach.
Sticta pulmonaria var. hypomela (Delise) Duby (1830),  accepted as Lobaria pulmonaria (L.) Hoffm. (1796)
Sticta guercizans Ach.
Sticta subcrocata Gyeln.
Sticta sylvatica Ach.
Sticta retigera Ac.
Sticta thouarsii Del.
Sticta tomentosa Ach.
Sticta variabilis Ach.
Sticta weigelii Ach.
Sticta weigelii var. sublimbata Steiner.

Family: Stictaceae

Genus: Stictina
Stictina argyracea Nyl.
Stictina argyracea var. flavescens Nyl.
Stictina argyracea var. rigidula Nyl.
Stictina aurata Aeh.
Stictina carpoloma Nyl. var. albocyphellata Nyl.
Stictina crocata Nyl.
Stictina fuliginosa Nyl.
Stictina gilva Nyl.
Stictina hesseana Krempelh.
Stictina intricata Nyl.
Stictina intricata var. thouarsii Nyl.
Stictina limbata Nyl.
Stictina membranacea Müll.Arg.
Stictina mougeotiana var. aurigera Nyl.
Stictina quercizans Nyl.
Stictina quercizans Stizenb.
Stictina sylvatica Nyl.
Stictina tomentosa Nyl.

Genus: Stictis
Stictis bella Kalchbr. & Cooke.
Stictis radiata Pers. ex Fr.
Stictis thelotremoides Phill.

Genus: Stigmatea
Stigmatea grewiae P.Henn.
Stigmatea platylophi Verw. & du Pless.
Stigmatea rhynchosiae Kalchbr. & Cooke. 
Stigmatea sutherlandiae Kalchbr. & Cooke.

Family:Stigmateaceae

Genus: Stigmatidium
Stigmatidium capense Stizenb.
Stigmatidium venosum Nyl.

Genus: Stigmatolemina
Stigmatolemina incanum Kalchbr.

Genus: Stigmatopeltis
Stigmatopeltis royenae Doidge

Genus: Stigmatida
Stigmatida rhynchosiae Syd.
Stigmatida sutherlandiae Syd.

Genus: Stigmella
Stigmella graminicola Linder.

Genus: Stigmina
Stigmina verruculosa Syd.

Family:Stilbaceae

Genus: Stilbospora
Stilbospora faureae Syd.

Genus: Stilbum
Stilbum aurantio-cinnabarinum Speg.
Stilbum caespitosum Welw. & Curr.
Stilbum cineripes Kalchbr. & Cooke.
Stilbum cinnabarinum  Mont. (1837), accepted as Tubercularia lateritia (Berk.) Seifert (1985)
Stilbum connatum Kalchbr. & Cooke.
Stilbum fimetarium Pers.
Stilbum fimetarium var. simiarum Kalchbr.
Stilbum kalchbrenneri Sacc.
Stilbum lateritium Berk. (1840), accepted as Tubercularia lateritia (Berk.) Seifert (1985)
Stilbum physarioides Kalchbr.

Genus: Stomiopeltella
Stomiopeltella africana Doidge

Genus: Stomiopeltis
Stomiopeltis citri Bitanc.
Stomiopeltis petiolaris Doidge

Genus: Streptothrix
Streptothrix sp.

Genus: Strigula (Lichens)
Strigula actinoplacoides Vain.
Strigula africana Wain. var. natalensis Vain.
Strigula argyronema Müll.Arg.
Strigula complanata Nyl.
Strigula complanata var. virescens Nyl.
Strigula elegans Müll.Arg.
Strigula nemathora Mont.
Strigula pallida Kalchbr.
Strigula virescens Trevis.

Family: Strigulaceae (Lichens)

Genus: Strobilomyces
Strobilomyces strobilaceus Berk.

Genus: Stropharia
Stropharia albomaculata Kalchbr. & MacOwan
Stropharia coronilla Quel.
Stropharia melanosperma Quel.
Stropharia obturata Quel.
Stropharia olivaceo-flava Sacc.
Stropharia semiglobata (Batsch) Quél. (1872), accepted as Protostropharia semiglobata (Batsch) Redhead, Moncalvo & Vilgays (2013)

Sy
Genus: Synalissa (lichens) 
Synalissa austroafricana Zahlbr.
Synalissa aminuscula Nyl.

Genus: Syncephalastrum
Syncephalastrum racemosum Schroet.

Family: Synchytriaceae

Genus: Synchytrium
Synchytrium cotulae du Pless.
Synchytrium dolichi Gaiimann.
Synchytrium endobioticum Perc.

Genus: Synechoblastis
Synechoblastis redundans Müll.Arg.

Genus: Systremma
Systremma pterocarpi Doidge

References

Sources

See also
 List of bacteria of South Africa
 List of Oomycetes of South Africa
 List of slime moulds of South Africa

 List of fungi of South Africa
 List of fungi of South Africa – A
 List of fungi of South Africa – B
 List of fungi of South Africa – C
 List of fungi of South Africa – D
 List of fungi of South Africa – E
 List of fungi of South Africa – F
 List of fungi of South Africa – G
 List of fungi of South Africa – H
 List of fungi of South Africa – I
 List of fungi of South Africa – J
 List of fungi of South Africa – K
 List of fungi of South Africa – L
 List of fungi of South Africa – M
 List of fungi of South Africa – N
 List of fungi of South Africa – O
 List of fungi of South Africa – P
 List of fungi of South Africa – Q
 List of fungi of South Africa – R
 List of fungi of South Africa – S
 List of fungi of South Africa – T
 List of fungi of South Africa – U
 List of fungi of South Africa – V
 List of fungi of South Africa – W
 List of fungi of South Africa – X
 List of fungi of South Africa – Y
 List of fungi of South Africa – Z

Further reading
Kinge TR, Goldman G, Jacobs A, Ndiritu GG, Gryzenhout M (2020) A first checklist of macrofungi for South Africa. MycoKeys 63: 1-48. https://doi.org/10.3897/mycokeys.63.36566

  

Fungi
Fungi S